Gregory Medavoy is a fictional character (as well as a protagonist) in the television series NYPD Blue. He was played by Gordon Clapp from the third episode of the 1st season to the last episode of the series.  Aside from Andy Sipowicz, he was the longest running regular character in the series.

Biography
Often on the receiving end of jokes about his bumbling speech and mannerisms, Medavoy often provided comic relief. Despite his faults, he was actually a skilled detective who earned respect through his tenacity and inventiveness; he had a knack for talking people into doing things they were initially reluctant to do, including coming to the police station to be questioned, or confessing to a crime. On one occasion, he was commended for bluffing a murder suspect by matching the suspect's rapid fire lies with lies of his own that were so fast and skillful that the suspect believed he had been seen committing the crime, which prompted him to confess. In another incident where he demonstrated his skills and earned a commendation, Medavoy went into a 15th Precinct holding cell undercover and tricked a conman into confessing by pretending to be interested in learning how to execute the con himself. During the series, Medavoy was promoted to Detective Second Grade.

The other cops, chiefly Sipowicz, sometimes treated him with contempt due to his tendency to drone on about arcane subjects and his general eagerness to be liked. He was also sidetracked occasionally by thoughts of money making opportunities based on people he met in his police work, including dog breeders, and a conman who sold a book claiming it was possible to legally avoid paying federal income taxes. His partners James Martinez and Baldwin Jones were usually able to get him to focus again with "Let's go, Greg!" or "Come on, Greg!". He was also sometimes the subject of practical jokes, including one where Sipowicz caused him to think free Chinese food he had received from a grateful crime victim whose case he worked on was the subject of an Internal Affairs Bureau investigation, which prompted Medavoy to climb into a dumpster and recover the containers so he could dispose of the "evidence" where IAB detectives would not find it.

Initially, he was unhappily married to a nagging woman named Marie, whom he caught cheating on him. He had an affair with Donna Abandando, the squad receptionist, and Medavoy's existing marriage made the relationship difficult. After the pressure became too much for Abandando to cope with, she ended things with Greg, who tried unsuccessfully to return to his marriage. He was later attracted to coworker Abby Sullivan, who revealed that she was a lesbian, and that her partner Kathy and she were interested in having him father their child through artificial insemination. Greg agreed; while Abby was pregnant, Kathy was killed. Abby gave birth at the same time that Det. James Martinez and his wife had their first child, and Greg was present when Abby's baby was born.

In Season 7, Medavoy's partner James Martinez was promoted, and Greg was then partnered with Baldwin Jones, a young detective who had worked in the Bias Crimes unit. Though they were polar opposites in appearance and demeanor, the two soon grew a friendship that was tested by Greg's neuroses and the younger Baldwin's irritation over them, but Baldwin's calm demeanor and occasional bemusement enabled him to cope. Medavoy also overcame a witch hunt by Lt. Bale, who turned him in to Internal Affairs and tried to wreck his career after learning he was employed part-time at a bar, though it was against regulations for off-duty police officers to work at establishments that serve alcohol. After a hearing in which he was ordered to forfeit five days' pay, Medavoy returned to work and upbraided Bale for his autocratic ways, calling him a bully and a coward for not handling the matter face to face. Medavoy carried himself with a noticeable increase in confidence afterwards.

In the final few episodes, Medavoy retired in order to join the real estate business; the interpersonal skills he had developed as a detective enabled him to close a sale for his new girlfriend Bridgid, whom he had met on a fraud case, and she invited him to come to work with her. At his retirement party, Greg expressed his love for his career and coworkers, and closed with the traditional NYPD toast "to the guy that invented this job".  In the final episode of the series, Medavoy stopped by the 15th Precinct during a sales call while his former colleagues came and went amid demands of their investigations. This led Medavoy to observe out loud to himself, "Boy, when you're gone, you're gone".

References

Sources

Internet

Books

Fictional New York City Police Department detectives
NYPD Blue characters
Television characters introduced in 1993